Ren Longyun (born 12 October 1987 in Minhe, Qinghai) is a Chinese long-distance runner who specializes in the marathon.

He finished ninth (in the 10,000 metres) at the 2006 World Junior Championships and competed at the 2007 World Championships. He also finished second in the 2007 Beijing Marathon. Additionally, he represented his country at the 2008 Summer Olympics.

Achievements

Personal bests
5000 metres - 14:12.06 min (2004)
10,000 metres - 28:08.67 min (2007)
Marathon - 2:08:15 hrs (2007)

References

Team China 2008

1987 births
Living people
Chinese male long-distance runners
Chinese male marathon runners
People from Haidong
Runners from Qinghai
Athletes (track and field) at the 2010 Asian Games
Asian Games competitors for China
Competitors at the 2009 Summer Universiade
Competitors at the 2013 Summer Universiade